Pietro Paolo Pelandi (born 29 June 1959), known by his stage name P. Lion, is an Italian singer, songwriter, musician and producer.

Biography 
Pelandi took the name of "P. Lion" because of the three "P"s in his name and because the symbol of his family is a lion. (He is of noble descendance, his father being the count of Alzano Lombardo). He started to play the piano and write his own music at a young age.

Little is known about his private life. He divorced in 1990 after four years of marriage and now lives with his son Edoardo.

Career 
P. Lion's achieved international fame with his two hits "Happy Children" (1983, produced by Davide Zambelli of the band Scotch) and "Dream" (1984). "Dream" was the theme of the French TV and radio chart show Top 50 1984-93, and "Happy Children" has been remixed to become the new theme of the French Top 50 in France since 2000.

P. Lion's first album "Springtime", was released in 1984. He contributed significantly to its realization, writing music and lyrics for all the songs, working on the arrangements with Zambelli and Walter Verdi, co-producing and playing keyboards.

After his first album, P. Lion signed to the Milanese label Discomagic Records, the biggest dance label in Italy at the time. There, he produced his own singles such as "Believe Me" and "Under The Moon" with Durium. In 1995 he released "A Step In The Right Way", an album with FMA and the publisher Allione. He collaborates as arranger on some productions such as Betty Villani and Tony Sheridan.

Discography 
 Springtime (1984)
 A Step In The Right Way... (1995)

Singles:
 Happy Children (Carrère Records, 1984) (Switzerland #11, Germany #15, Netherlands #15, Belgium #5, Spain #14)  
 Dream (Carrère Records, 1984) (Germany #24, France #25)
 Reggae radio (Carrère Records, 1984)
 Believe me (Durium, 1985)
 Under the moon (Durium, 1986)
 You'll never break my heart (Durium, 1987)
 Burn In His Hand (P.Lion Production, 1991)

References

External links 
 
 

1959 births
20th-century Italian male singers
21st-century Italian male singers
Italian male singer-songwriters
Italian multi-instrumentalists
Italian pop singers
Italian dance musicians
Italian Italo disco musicians
Living people
People from Alzano Lombardo